Sir Thomas Beaumont Hohler  (15 March 1871 — 23 April 1946) was a British diplomat.

He was born in St George Hanover Square, London, the sixth son of Henry Booth Hohler of Fawkham Manor near Gravesend and Henrietta Wilhelmina Lawes. His older brother was politician and barrister Sir Gerald Hohler. Hohler was educated at Eton and Trinity College, Cambridge.

Hohler entered the diplomatic service in 1894, and was appointed a Second Secretary in August 1901.

During World War I, he was head of the British delegation to Mexico, in Mexico City, and was involved in the interception of the German Zimmermann Telegram that was used to promote the entry of the United States into the war. Although acting anonymously at the time, he later identified himself as the mysterious "Mr. H" responsible for intercepting the inflammatory telegram.

In 1920, Hohler served as the High Commissioner of the British Legation in Budapest, Hungary. In Hungary, he made a controversial effort to convince the British Government to revise the terms of the Trianon Treaty to better favor Hungary.

Hohler later served as the head of the British Commercial delegation to Bogotá, Colombia, and as British Minister to Denmark 1928–1933.

In 1942, he published Diplomatic Petrel.

Hohler in 1922 married Cynthia Elizabeth Violet Astell, daughter of William Harvey Astell and Lady Elizabeth Maria Vereker, and a descendant (through Vereker) of the Schuyler family, the Van Cortlandt family and the Delancey family from colonial British North America. Their children were Gerald Arthur Hohler and Anne Elizabeth Hohler.

He died at Fawkham Manor, aged 75.

Sources

A Case Study on Trianon

1871 births
1946 deaths
People educated at Eton College
Alumni of Trinity College, Cambridge
Ambassadors of the United Kingdom to Denmark
Companions of the Order of the Bath
Knights Commander of the Order of St Michael and St George
English justices of the peace